is a 2012 Japanese-Korean anime television series by Tatsunoko Productions and Avex Pictures in cooperation with Takara Tomy Arts and Syn Sophia, based on the arcade game of the same name. The series is part of the Pretty Rhythm franchise and is its second animated series, focusing on a group of Japanese and Korean idols known as "Prism Stars" that combine song and dance with fashion and figure skating. The anime series was created as a tie-in to promote the arcade game of the same name.

Pretty Rhythm: Dear My Future is a sequel to the 2011 anime series Pretty Rhythm: Aurora Dream and was written in an attempt to launch the Pretty Rhythm franchise in South Korea. The series features fictional characters based on Prizmmy and Puretty, with the latter group making their Japanese and South Korean debut through the show.

During the series' run, each episode ended with a live-action segment titled "Pretty Rhythm Studio" hosted by Prizmmy, along with their sister trainee group Prism Mates. After the series' run, it was succeeded by Pretty Rhythm: Rainbow Live in 2013.

Plot

Setting
Pretty Rhythm: Dear My Future is set 3 years after Pretty Rhythm: Aurora Dream in Odaiba, Japan. The series focuses on Prism Stars, who are idols performing figure skating routines through a combination of fashion, song, and dance, with special moves called Prism Jumps and heart-shaped stones called Prism Stones to accessorize. Prism Shows have a new system called Prism Act and Fan Calls. Fan Calls are votes provided by the audience on their phone throughout the duration of a show. A Prism Act is a special finishing move featuring an acting performance that is achieved by landing perfect Prism Jumps and earning the highest amount of Fan Calls.

Synopsis

Mia Ageha decides to join Pretty Top School in order to challenge Aira Harune, the current Prism Queen. Mia, along with fellow trainees Reina Miyama, Karin Shijimi, and Ayami Ōruri, debut as Prizmmy. At the same time, Pretty Top School (owned by Kyoko Asechi) gains five international students from South Korea — Hye-in, Shi-yoon, Jae-eun, Chae-kyoung, and So-min — who debut as Puretty. While keeping up with their idol activities, both groups also enter the Symphonia Series tournaments, with prizes consisting of rare Prism Stones consisting various clothing from the Symphonia Series, a line created by Kintaro Asechi. In the process, they learn how to perform Prism Acts, a finishing move at the end of a Prism Show that includes a short acting performance.

As Prizmmy and Puretty's skills grow, Don Bomby, the host of the Symphonia Series, manipulates Pretty Top School into entering them into more Symphonia Series tournaments. Revealing himself as Kintaro Asechi, he hopes to realize his dream of performing "Grateful Symphonia", an ultimate Prism Act that will change the landscape of Prism Shows and end the need for competitive tournaments. Kintaro targets Aira as the performer of "Grateful Symphonia" and begins sniping all Prism Stars who lose against her to be in his company. In order to combat him, the outfits from the Symphonia Series tournaments are remade with purer thoughts to help Prizmmy and Puretty defeat Aira in the Sky High Symphonia tournament.

After Pretty Top School and Aira are saved, Kintaro sabotages Kyoko's reputation by revealing he used his connections to influence her Prism Star career in the past, and this causes Prism Shows to lose popularity. In order to heal Kintaro and change the public's favor, the acts at Pretty Top School agree to perform "Grateful Symphonia." The Grateful Symphonia tournament is held to decide the center dance position in "Grateful Symphonia", but Mia and Hye-in tie, and Pretty Top School decides to perform "Grateful Symphonia" for the Goddess of the Prism Shows to decide. During "Grateful Symphonia", Kintaro intervenes, but Mia convinces him that competitive Prism Shows and her friendly rivalry with Hye-in motivates her to grow as a better performer. Mia and Hye-in's friendship causes the Goddess to crown them both as the centers, and together, the acts at Pretty Top School complete the "Grateful Symphonia" and Prism Shows are saved. Afterwards, the characters move on with their lives and careers.

Media

Game

Beginning with the season 9, the Pretty Rhythm: Aurora Dream arcade game was relaunched under the name Pretty Rhythm: Dear My Future on April 26, 2012 to coincide with the anime adaptation tie-in. The season 9 update, titled "Prizmmy Debut Edition", added Mia Ageha, Reina Miyama, Karin Shijimi, and Ayami Ōruri, as playable characters. The game featured a new system that focuses on "Prism Acts", which is a bonus round achieved by having perfect Prism Jumps. Season 10, "Puretty Debut Edition", was launched on July 19, 2012, adding Hye-in, So-min, Shi-yoon, Chae-kyoung, and Jae-eun as playable characters. Season 11, "Dear My Future Team Shuffle Edition", was launched on September 27, 2012.

Anime

Pretty Rhythm: Dear My Future aired between April 7, 2012 and March 30, 2013 as a direct sequel to Pretty Rhythm: Aurora Dream. In an attempt to market the franchise to South Korea, SBS Viacom joined the production as a subsidiary. The animation was co-produced by Tatsunoko Production and Dong Woo Animation. The series features fictional characters based on the girl group Prizmmy as the main cast. An upcoming girl group tentatively named "DSP Girls", later named Puretty, debuted through the show with characters based on the members appearing as the secondary cast, with the real-life members also appearing in the live-action segments.

A live-action variety show segment titled "Pretty Rhythm Studio" appeared in every episode, hosted by MC Kensaku, the real-life members of Prizmmy, and a new set of trainees from Avex Dance Master known as the Prism Mates. In the Korean dub of the series, the "Charming School at Prism Stone" live-action skits aired instead of "Pretty Rhythm Studio", with the real-life members of Puretty starring in them.

The English dub for Pretty Rhythm: Dear My Future was broadcast on Animax Asia beginning April 14, 2014 for Southeast Asian distribution.

Manga

A manga adaptation illustrated by Michiyo Kikuta was serialized in Pucchigumi.

Merchandise

To coincide with the launch of Dear My Future, a Prism Stone shop opened in Venus Fort in Odaiba, Japan, where the series takes place. In addition, Dear Crown, a brand introduced in Dear My Future, opened its flagship store at the same location. In February 2013, plans for both Prism Stone and Dear Crown shops to open in South Korea were announced as a tie-in to Pretty Rhythm: Dear My Future airing in the country, but the shops were never opened.

References

External links
  at Takara Tomy 
 Pretty Rhythm: Dear My Future official anime website

Pretty Rhythm
2012 anime television series debuts
Japanese children's animated sports television series
Anime films based on video games
Anime television series based on video games
Arcade video games
Arcade-only video games
Music in anime and manga
Shogakukan manga
Shōjo manga
Sports anime and manga
Syn Sophia games
Takara Tomy franchises
Tatsunoko Production
TV Tokyo original programming
Japanese idols in anime and manga
Figure skating in anime and manga
Video games developed in Japan